Louis Alan Hazeltine (August 7, 1886 – May 24, 1964) was an engineer and physicist, the inventor of the Neutrodyne circuit, and the Hazeltine-Fremodyne Superregenerative circuit. He was the founder of the Hazeltine Corporation.

Biography 
Louis Alan Hazeltine was born in Morristown, New Jersey, in 1886 and attended the Stevens Institute of Technology in Hoboken, New Jersey, majoring in electrical engineering. He graduated in 1906 and accepted a job with General Electric corporation.

Hazeltine returned to Stevens to teach, eventually becoming chair of the electrical engineering department in 1917.

The following year he became a consultant for the United States Navy.  The Navy job eventually parlayed into a position as an advisor to the U.S. government on radio broadcasting regulation, and later, a position on the National Defense Research Committee during World War II.

Hazeltine was president of the Institute of Radio Engineers in 1936.

References

Further reading 
 "Adventures in Cybersound: Louis Alan Hazeltine : 1886 - 1964"
 Reiman, Dick, "Scanning the Past: A History of Electrical Engineering from the Past: Louis Alan Hazeltine", Copyright 1993 IEEE. Reprinted with permission from the IEEE publication, "Scanning the Past" which covers a reprint of an article appearing in the Proceedings of the IEEE Vol. 81, No. 4, April 1993.

External links
 "The Neutrodyne Radio", Arcane Radio Trivia, Tuesday, October 2, 2007

1886 births
1964 deaths
People from Morristown, New Jersey
Stevens Institute of Technology alumni
American electronics engineers
Engineers from New Jersey
Fellows of the American Physical Society